Saint-Sulpice is a station on Line 4 of the Paris Métro. It is located on the Rive Gauche, in the 6th arrondissement. In 2018, 2,350,813 travelers entered this station which places it at the 234th position of Métro stations for its traffic.

Location

The station is located under the Rue de Rennes at the intersection with the Rue du Vieux-Colombier.

History
The station was opened on 9 January 1910 as part of the connecting section of the line under the Seine between Châtelet and Raspail. It is named after the nearby Church of Saint-Sulpice, famous for its gnomon.

In the spring of 2010, the station underwent renovations as part of the Un métro + beau operation. From June to July 2019, platform doors were installed on the platforms as part of the line's ongoing full automation.

Passenger services

Access
The station has three entrances:
 Entrance 1: Rue de Rennes, Rue du Four side in front of 65 Rue de Rennes
 Entrance 2: in front of 69 Rue de Rennes
 Entrance 3: rue de Rennes, rue de Mézières (escalator)

The two entrances located on the Rue de Rennes on either side of the Rue du Vieux-Colombier are decorated with a Val d'Osne candelabra.

Station layout

Bus connections
 RATP buses 39, 63, 70, 84, 87, 95, 96
 Night buses N01, N02, N12, N13

Nearby
Also nearby are the Church of Saint-Sulpice of Paris, Luxembourg Palace, the Saint-Germain-des-Prés neighbourhood, Rue Bonaparte, Institute of Intercultural Management and Communication and the mairie of the 6th arrondissement.

Gallery

References

Roland, Gérard (2003). Stations de métro. D’Abbesses à Wagram. Éditions Bonneton.

Paris Métro stations in the 6th arrondissement of Paris
Railway stations in France opened in 1910